A.C. Virtus Acquaviva is a Sanmarinese football club, based in Acquaviva. The club was founded in 1964. Virtus currently plays in Girone B of Campionato Sammarinese di Calcio. The team's colors are green and black.

Achievements
San Marino Federal Trophy: 1
 1988

Current squad

External links
FSGC page
eufo.de – Team Squad
https://www.acvirtus.com/

 
Association football clubs established in 1964
Football clubs in San Marino
Former Italian football clubs
1964 establishments in San Marino